Estrambótica Anastasia is a Venezuelan telenovela developed by Martín Hahn and produced by Radio Caracas Television in 2004.

Norkys Batista and Juan Pablo Raba starred as the protagonists with Dora Mazzone, Miguel Augusto Rodríguez as the antagonists.

Plot 
Anastasia is a beautiful woman who came from humble beginnings and whose dreams become reality when, thanks to her extravagant personality, she gets a well known jewelry company out of bankruptcy. This generates her millions of dollars with her work as a model. Anastasia becomes the Borosfky family's good luck charm. However, she meets Aureliano and that whole glamorous world will become her worst nightmare. Once in search of her freedom, Anastasia will meet the dark side of the Borosfky dynasty and will reveal one by one the secrets hidden behind the Cross of Dreams, an accursed jewel, valued at millions of dollars, which belonged to the Empress Catherine II of Russia. Terrorized and anxious to save herself, she will suffer an attack that ends the life of one of her sisters, whose body will disappear along with a large part of the Borosfky inheritance. This tragedy will cause Anastasia to return to the Borosfky mansion to try to figure out the plan carried out against her. While this occurs, Aureliano will become her most fervent ally and the only man who can make her dream again.

Cast 
 Norkys Batista as Anastasia Valbuena de Borosfky/Alexandra/Catalina
 Juan Pablo Raba as Aureliano Paz
 Mayra Alejandra as Yolanda Paz
 Gustavo Rodríguez as Don Toño Borosfky
 Dad Dager as Violeta Silva
 Saul Marin as Ovidio Borosfky
 Hilda Abrahamz as Constanza
 Flavio Caballero as Aquiles
 Dora Mazzone as Agripina
 Manuel Salazar as Teobaldo
 Kiara as Bromelia
 Luciano D'Alessandro as Santiago
 Crisol Carabal as Gregoria
 Ivan Tamayo as Maco
 Marianela González as Maria Gracia
 Yoletty Cabrera as Pia
 Rodolfo Renwick as Mateo
 Gabriela Santeliz as Demetria
 Prakriti Maduro as Clementina
 Carlos Felipe Alvarez as Nicolas
 Kareliz Ollarves as Emilia Margarita
 Miguel Augusto Rodriguez as Leon
 Freddy Aquino asJoseito
 Cesar D' La Torre as Leandro
 Daniela Navarro as Yadira
 Susana Kolster as Claudia
 Israel Baez as Eduardito
 Verushka Scalia as Manuela Fast

Music 
 "En Tu Cruz Me Clavaste" is sung by Spanish singer Chenoa who made a guest appearance on the show as herself. 
 "Eso" by Argentine singer Axel Fernando which is the theme for Anastasia and Aureliano
 "Luz" by Spanish singer Miguel Nandez, which is the theme for Santiago and Violeta.

References

External links

 Estrambótica Anastasia (Spanish)
 Estrambótica Anastasia- Characters (Spanish)

Venezuelan telenovelas
2004 telenovelas
RCTV telenovelas
2004 Venezuelan television series debuts
2005 Venezuelan television series endings
Spanish-language telenovelas
Television shows set in Caracas